Eve Josephson Garrison (1903-2003) was a modernist painter. Her early works focused on a realist style including landscapes and cityscapes, specifically depicting Chicago, Colorado, and Mexico. She also painted nudes and portraits and increasingly abstract and textured art in later life. She suggested creating work for juried shows and annuals was not the way "to be a great artists!" Instead, she began making work that felt was more expressive of her ideas. In the sixties she began making work that she termed "sculptural relief oil paintings." This involved a process of embedding objects such as seeds, branches, glass, and string into the paint. During the period she was producing more abstract work she had solo exhibitions in New York, Detroit, Milwaukee, Miami, Paris, and London.

In 1957, Garrison, along with twenty-three other artists, including Leo Segedin, co-founded Exhibit A, the first post-war, artist-run cooperative gallery in Chicago.

Early life
Garrison graduated from School of the Art Institute of Chicago in 1930. She also exhibited at the Art Institute of Chicago's Annual Chicago and Vicinity Artists exhibition between 1934 and 1940.

Exhibitions 
 1934-1940 Annual Exhibition of Works by Chicago and Vicinity Artists, AIC
 1983 After the Great Crash: New Deal Art in Illinois, Illinois State Museum
 2007 Eve Garrison: Life Study, 70 Years of figurative painting

Awards 
 1933 Prize, Chicago Galleries Association
 1933 Prize, Washington (DC) Society of Artists

References 

1903 births
2003 deaths
School of the Art Institute of Chicago alumni
20th-century American women artists
20th-century American people
21st-century American women